Catoptria fibigeri is a species of moth in the family Crambidae. It is found in Greece.

References

Moths described in 1987
Crambini
Moths of Europe